Jack Frazier (1937–2003) was an American man who was taken hostage in 1990 by Saddam Hussein's forces in Baghdad.

Frazier was a diabetic and was denied his medication during his time as a hostage, which was close to one month. This affected him seriously, as he ended up losing his eyesight from one of his eyes as a consequence.  Frazier sued the republic of Iraq in 1991, and in April 2003, Frazier was given the sum of 1,750,000 dollars as compensation. He was one of 180 people to successfully sue the Republic of Iraq.

Frazier moved to Nevada after his ordeal. On June 2 of 2003, he died in Lake Havasu City, Arizona, of complications related to his illness.

1937 births
2003 deaths
Deaths from diabetes